Charles Gregory Swenson (born March 28, 1941) is an American animator, writer, storyboard artist, sound designer, producer and director who worked with animated film for many years. In 1978 he joined Fred Wolf Films, working on Teenage Mutant Ninja Turtles. He is also the creator of Cartoon Network's Mike, Lu & Og in which he also wrote the scripts for several episodes as well serving as executive producer and voice director. He left the entertainment industry in the early 2000s to become a painter.

Filmography

Feature films

Shorts

TV series

Video games

External links
Charles G. Swenson official site

Living people
American animated film directors
American animated film producers
Film producers from California
Television producers from California
American television writers
American male screenwriters
American storyboard artists
American animators
American male television writers
American voice directors
20th-century American painters
American sound designers
Cartoon Network Studios people
Hanna-Barbera people
Writers from Los Angeles
1941 births
Film directors from Los Angeles
Screenwriters from California
21st-century American painters